Daniel Hemmert is an American businessman and politician who served as a Republican member of the Utah Senate from 2016 to 2021. He was appointed in August 2016 in order to succeed Alvin B. Jackson, who had resigned the previous month.

Hemmert owns a dry cleaning business known as Red Hanger Cleaners and in the past has worked as a chief financial officer for OrangeSoda and JR Miller Enterprises. He ran for a full term to the Senate seat in the 2016 election, and won. Hemmert also served as an alternate delegate for Mitt Romney to the 2012 Republican National Convention.

Hemmert joined the Republican primary to serve as Utah's 4th congressional district's representative, challenging Ben McAdams. He was considered an early leader in the primary. However, he dropped out of the race in December 2019, citing problems transitioning out of his leadership position at Red Hanger.

Personal life
Hemmert and his wife, Natalie, have 6 children and reside in Orem, Utah. He is a member of the Church of Jesus Christ of Latter-day Saints.

References

External links
 
 Campaign website
 Letter of appointment to Senate

21st-century American politicians
Brigham Young University alumni
Businesspeople from Utah
Latter Day Saints from Utah
Living people
Politicians from Orem, Utah
Republican Party Utah state senators
Year of birth missing (living people)